Thou-Vou falakros praktor, epiheirisis "Yis Mathiam" is a 1969 Greek spy comedy film directed by Thanasis Vengos, written by Giorgos Lazaridis,  and starring Thanasis Vengos, Zannino, and Antonis Papadopoulos. The film was shot in black-and-white.

The film was a sequel to Voitheia! O Vengos faneros praktor 000 (1967).

Title
The film title means Thou-Vou the Bald Agent and Operation Destruction of the Land"'.

The title character is codenamed Thou-Vou (. "Thou" stands for Theta, "Vou" stands for Beta. They form the Greek initials of protagonist Thanasis Vengos (Θανάσης Βέγγος, pronounced: Thanássis Végos).

"Yis Mathiam" derives from the terms Γης (Yis or Gis) for "Land" and Μαδιάμ (Mathiam or Madiam) for Midian, a Biblical area. The term is a byword of destruction in modern Greek.

Plot
The inept secret agent Thou-Vou (Thanasis Vengos) has finally graduated. He and his fellow agent MAP 31 (Antonis Papadopoulos) partner up to open their own agency. Their first customers are drama film director Tzimis Paloukas (Vasilis Andreopoulos) and his associates from the film company "Ah Vah" (Greek: Αχ Βαχ, the term means woe). They task them with three missions but their true intention is to secretly film the agents in action. They are fully aware of their ineptness and intend to use the footage for Ah Vah's first comedy film. The missions are an excuse for a series of gags.

One of their missions involves searching for a hippie by the name of Roza Alimonou (Sofi Zanninou). Thou-Vou is convinced that this is the true identity of a Romani woman who happens to go by the name Roza (Sassa Kazeli). The misunderstanding causes fights in a Romani camp.  Another has them take part in a catch wrestling match against wrestler Spazokefalos (Dimitri Karystinos), whose professional name means "Headbreaker". The third has them interrupt the filming process of one of Ah Vah's rival firms.

The final mission proves fatal for Thou-Vou. The film ends with the deceased agent in the afterlife, preparing to enter Heaven.

 Cast 
 Thanasis Veggos ..... Thou-Vou Antonis Papadopoulos ..... Map 31 Vasilis Andreopoulos ..... Dimis Zannino ..... Jacob Kostas Mentis ..... Theodoros Sasa Kazeli ..... Roza Giorgos Tzifos ..... Apostolos Kostas Stavrinoudakis ..... assistant director Periklis Christoforidis ..... school director Stathis Hatzipavlis ..... Pantelis Alimonos Sophie Zaninou ..... Rosa Alimonou Makis Demiris ..... Hippie leader Rena Paschalidou ..... instructor Kostas Papachristos ..... Sou-Pou Dimitris Karystinos ..... Spazokefalos Apostolos Souglakos ..... Spazokefalos's opponent Takis Miliadis ..... Lolos''

External links

1969 films
1960s Greek-language films
Greek comedy films
Films directed by Thanasis Vengos
Greek black-and-white films
1960s spy comedy films
Films about filmmaking
1969 comedy films